The 2021 St. Petersburg Ladies' Trophy is a professional tennis tournament played on indoor hard courts. It is the 12th edition of the tournament and a WTA 500 tournament on the 2021 WTA Tour. The tournament is held between 15 and 21 March 2021.

Champions

Singles 

  Daria Kasatkina def.  Margarita Gasparyan, 6–3, 2–1, ret.

Doubles 

  Nadiia Kichenok /  Raluca Olaru def.  Kaitlyn Christian /  Sabrina Santamaria, 2–6, 6–3, [10–8].

Point distribution

Prize money 

1Qualifiers prize money is also the Round of 32 prize money.
*per team

Singles main draw entrants

Seeds 

1 Rankings as of March 8, 2021.

Other entrants 
The following players received wildcards into the singles main draw:
  Margarita Gasparyan
  Daria Mishina
  Vera Zvonareva 

The following player received entry into the singles main draw using a protected ranking:
  Vera Lapko

The following players received entry from the qualifying draw:
  Jaqueline Cristian
  Anastasia Gasanova
  Kamilla Rakhimova
  Arina Rodionova
  Clara Tauson
  Wang Xinyu

The following player received entry as a lucky loser:
  Çağla Büyükakçay

Withdrawals 
Before the tournament
  Belinda Bencic → replaced by  Kirsten Flipkens
  Sorana Cîrstea → replaced by  Aliaksandra Sasnovich
  Elise Mertens → replaced by  Çağla Büyükakçay
  Yulia Putintseva → replaced by  Daria Kasatkina
  Alison Riske → replaced by  Katarina Zavatska
  Anastasija Sevastova → replaced by  Vera Lapko
  Jil Teichmann → replaced by  Viktoriya Tomova
  Patricia Maria Țig → replaced by  Ana Bogdan
  Donna Vekić → replaced by  Paula Badosa

Retirements 
  Vera Lapko (cramping)
  Margarita Gasparyan (lower-back injury)

Doubles main draw entrants

Seeds 

1 Rankings as of March 8, 2021.

Other entrants 
The following pair received a wildcard into the doubles main draw:
  Daria Mishina /  Ekaterina Shalimova
  Elena Vesnina /  Vera Zvonareva

The following pairs received entry using protected rankings:
  Oksana Kalashnikova /  Alla Kudryavtseva
  Aleksandra Krunić /  Alexandra Panova

Withdrawals 
Before the tournament
  Georgina García Pérez /  Bibiane Schoofs → replaced by  Ekaterina Alexandrova /  Yana Sizikova
  Lyudmyla Kichenok /  Jeļena Ostapenko → replaced by  Jeļena Ostapenko /  Valeria Savinykh
  Veronika Kudermetova /  Elise Mertens → replaced by  Laura Ioana Paar /  Julia Wachaczyk
  Lidziya Marozava /  Andreea Mitu → replaced by  Lidziya Marozava /  Aliaksandra Sasnovich
  Vera Lapko /  Cornelia Lister  → replaced by  Çağla Büyükakçay /  Magdalena Fręch

References

External links 
 

St. Petersburg Ladies' Trophy
St. Petersburg Ladies Trophy
2021 in Russian tennis
St. Petersburg Ladies' Trophy